The Ramblers Stadium is a football stadium in Windhoek, Namibia. It is the home of the Ramblers F.C. club and it has a capacity of 1,000 people.

Football venues in Namibia
Buildings and structures in Windhoek
Sport in Windhoek